Flip Records was an American record label that flourished in the 1950s, releasing rhythm and blues and doo-wop music by such artists as Richard Berry, The Six Teens, Donald Wood, the Elgins, and many others. Max and Lilian Feirtag operated the label in Los Angeles, California, and published music under the Limax Music trademark.

The biggest, most lasting success was Richard Berry's original recording of his song "Louie, Louie," which came out in 1957 (although it was only a regional hit and The Six Teens' "A Casual Look" was a much bigger national hit).

In 2000, Ace Records of England purchased the assets of the original Flip Records catalog, and has been releasing this vintage music for the CD market.

See also 
 List of record labels
 Flip Records

External links 
 Flip Singles Discography
 Flip Album Discography
 Flip Doo Wop Volume 1 notes
 Allmusic.com: Flip Doo Wop Volume 1
 Ace Records of England

Defunct record labels of the United States
Rhythm and blues record labels